Intisar Ali Al-Sharrah (5 November 1962 – 31 July 2021) was a Kuwaiti actress. She was one of the few female comedians in Kuwait in the 1980s and 1990s.

Career 
Her real debut was through the play "By Bye London". She graduated from the Higher Institute of Dramatic Arts in 1985. During her career, she participated in many theater and television works. She was the only actress of her generation to play comedic roles, and she was able to dominate in that period of stardom, to the extent that she formed a duet with the artist Daoud Hussein, and together they presented the most prominent comedic works such as: "With Melodies", "Take and Leave", "Cocktail", "Nest of Marriage", "TV channels" and others.

Personal life 
She was married to Mazen Salem Al-Tamimi, and they have three children: Dalal, Salem, and Ali.

Death 
She died on Saturday morning, 31 July 2021, after a long illness, in the British capital, London, at the age of 58.

References

External links 
Intisar Al-Sharrah on Elcinema

20th-century Kuwaiti actresses
21st-century Kuwaiti actresses
Kuwaiti stage actresses
Kuwaiti television actresses
1962 births
2021 deaths